Mary Myelin Hayhoe is an Australian American  psychologist who researches vision. She has developed virtual environments for the investigation of visually guided behaviour. Hayhoe was awarded the 2022 Optica Award Edgar D. Tillyer Award for her contributions to visual perception and cognition.

Early life and education 
Hayhoe is from Australia. She was an undergraduate student at the University of Queensland, where she majored in psychology and mathematics. She then moved to England and studied at the University of Cambridge. In 1973, Hayhoe moved to the United States, and joined Florida State University as a research associate in psychology. Hayhoe joined the University of California, San Diego for graduate research, where she studied how eyes adapt to dark light environments.

Career and research
Hayhoe was appointed to the faculty at the University of California, Irvine and Columbia University. She moved to the University of Rochester in 1984, where she was promoted from assistant to associate and eventually full professor. In 1998, she was made Director of the Cognitive Science Program. In 2006, Hayhoe left Rochester and joined the University of Texas at Austin. 

Hayhoe's research considers visual sensation and the relationships between vision and movement.

Awards and honours 
 1970 Commonwealth Scholarship
 1993 Fellow of Optica
 2012 Bielefeld University Fellowship
 2017 Vision Sciences Society Davida Teller Award
 2018 Elected Fellow of the Society of Experimental Psychologists
 2022 Optica Award Edgar D. Tillyer Award

Selected publications

References 

Year of birth missing (living people)
Living people
Australian women psychologists
20th-century American psychologists
21st-century American psychologists
Australian psychologists
University of Queensland alumni
Alumni of the University of Cambridge
Florida State University people
University of California, Los Angeles alumni
University of California, Irvine faculty
Columbia University faculty
University of Rochester faculty
University of Texas at Austin faculty
American women psychologists
Australian emigrants to the United States
Fellows of Optica (society)
Fellows of the Society of Experimental Psychologists
20th-century American women scientists
21st-century American women scientists